The hooded crane (Grus monacha) is a  crane native to East Asia and a frequent migratory bird in Japan.

Description
It has a grey body. The top of the neck and head is white, except for a patch of bare red skin above the eye.

Distribution
The hooded crane breeds in south-central and south-eastern Siberia. Breeding is also suspected to occur in Mongolia. Over 80% of its population winters at Izumi, southern Japan. There are also wintering grounds in South Korea and China. There are about 100 hooded cranes wintering in Chongming Dongtan, Shanghai every year. Dongtan Nature Reserve is the largest natural wintering site in the world. In December 2011, a hooded crane was seen overwintering at the Hiwassee Refuge in southeastern Tennessee, well outside its normal range. In February 2012, one was seen at Goose Pond in southern Indiana, and is suspected to be the same bird, which may have migrated to North America by following sandhill cranes (Antigone canadensis). In March 2020, seven hooded cranes (Grus monacha) were seen in Siargao, Philippines where it was recorded as the first encounter of the species, since then, they are frequently migrating in the country, mainly on the wetlands in the southern regions.

Conservation
The estimated population of the species is 11,600 individuals. The major threats to its survival are wetland loss and degradation in its wintering grounds in China and South Korea as a result of reclamation for development and dam building. Conservation activities have been taken since 2008. Local universities, NGOs and communities are working together for a better and safer wintering location.

The hooded crane is evaluated as Vulnerable on the IUCN Red List of Threatened Species. It is listed on Appendix I and II of CITES. A society, Grus monacha International Aid (白头鹤的故事), has been formed to find ways to protect the species.

References

External links

 BirdLife Species Factsheet
 Hooded Crane (Grus monachus) from Cranes of the World (1983) by Paul Johnsgard

 
 

Grus (genus)
Birds of North Asia
Birds of Manchuria
Birds of East Asia
Birds described in 1835